Vaezi (adjective form of واعظ (wāʿiẓ), a Persian noun of Arabic origin meaning "preacher") is a surname. Notable people with the surname include:

 Hojjatollah Vaezi, Iranian archer
 Mehdi Vaezi, Iranian footballer
 Shamsodin Vaezi, Iraqi grand ayatollah